Olov Lundqvist (born November 23, 1988) is a Swedish professional ice hockey defenceman who plays with Asplöven HC of the Swedish Allsvenskan.

On February 27, 2014, Lundqvist was loaned to Luleå HF of the Swedish Hockey League (SHL).

References

External links

1988 births
Living people
Swedish ice hockey defencemen